Women's football in Lebanon officially began in 2005, with the creation of the Lebanese Women's Football (LWF). Despite the prejudice women have faced for playing football, the sport's popularity has risen since the late 2010s. Indeed, Lebanon has achieved significant success within the West Asia region.

Founded in 2008, the Lebanese Women's Football League is the national club league; Sadaka won the league a record seven times. Internationally, Safa became the first Lebanese team to win the WAFF Women's Clubs Championship in 2022.

The senior national team finished runners-up in the WAFF Women's Championship in 2022, and in third place twice in 2007 and 2019. The youth teams won the Arab U-17 Women's Cup in 2015, the WAFF U-18 Girls Championship in 2019 and 2022, and the WAFF U-16 Girls Championship in 2019 and 2023.

History 
In 2005, the Lebanese Women's Football (LWF) committee was formed, affiliated to the Lebanese Football Association, to oversee the women's national teams. While not popular, the sport has mainly been played in affluent areas in Lebanon. One of the barriers of the growing sport has been the prejudice that many women have faced for playing it.

From the late 2010s, however, football has become more widespread among the female population in Lebanon. With the Lebanese Football Association (LFA) investing more into the youth system, Lebanon has achieved considerable success within its region (West Asia) both at the national team and club levels.

Clubs 
The Lebanese Women's Football League was founded in 2008, with Sadaka winning the first title. They went on to win seven league titles in a row, until they dissolved in 2014. From the 2014–15 season onwards, Stars Association for Sports (SAS) became the dominating force in Lebanon, winning six of the following eight league titles. There are two domestic women's cup competitions in Lebanon: the Lebanese Women's FA Cup and the Lebanese Women's Super Cup.

In 2019, Stars Association for Sports (SAS) finished runners-up in the inaugural edition of the WAFF Women's Clubs Championship, a club competition for teams from West Asia. Safa became the first Lebanese team to win the competition, winning the final of the second edition in 2022.

National team
Founded in 2005 as one of the earliest women's national teams in West Asia, the senior national team made it debut at the 2006 Arab Women's Championship, where they finished in last place. They took part in their first official qualification tournament at the 2014 AFC Women's Asian Cup qualifiers. Lebanon finished runners-up at the WAFF Women's Championship in 2022, and in third place in 2007 and in 2019.

At the youth level, Lebanon won the Arab U-17 Women's Cup in 2015, while in 2019 they won both the WAFF U-15 Girls Championship and the WAFF U-18 Girls Championship. In 2022, Lebanon won the WAFF U-18 Girls Championship for the second time, defeating Syria 5–1 in the final as hosts, and in 2023 they won their second WAFF U-16 Girls Championship.

See also 
 Football in Lebanon
 List of women's association football clubs in Lebanon

References